Ben Nelson is the Founder and Chancellor of Minerva University as well as the Founder, Chairman, President and CEO of Minerva Project. Minerva Project is the for-profit educational organization that created the non-profit Minerva University with the mission of reforming global education through an interdisciplinary curriculum and fully active learning pedagogy, delivered on a proprietary learning environment called ForumTM. 

Prior to founding Minerva, he was the CEO and President of the global online photo hosting and printing company Snapfish at the time of its acquisition by HP. Nelson joined Snapfish in 1999. By 2002, Nelson was the CFO of Snapfish and had established himself as one of the company's lead business strategists. He became CEO and President of Snapfish in March 2005, just before the acquisition of the company by Hewlett-Packard. Afterwards, he continued to run the company as an HP subsidiary.

Nelson graduated from the Wharton School at the University of Pennsylvania with a B.S. in Economics with Honors as a Joseph Wharton Scholar.

References

External links 
NPR - Digital Photo Price War : Ben Nelson talks about Pricing Strategy
 "Reinventing the University - A Conversation with Ben Nelson", Ideas Roadshow, 2015

American computer businesspeople
Wharton School of the University of Pennsylvania alumni
Living people
1975 births